Peter Klemenc (born June 16, 1956) is a former Yugoslav ice hockey player. He played for the Yugoslavia men's national ice hockey team at the 1984 Winter Olympics in Sarajevo.

References

1956 births
Living people
Ice hockey players at the 1984 Winter Olympics
Olympic ice hockey players of Yugoslavia
Slovenian ice hockey forwards
Sportspeople from Jesenice, Jesenice
HK Acroni Jesenice players
Yugoslav ice hockey forwards